Abangan Ang Susunod Na Kabanata is a Filipino political satire comedy television series. It's a situational comedy that depicts the lives of the common "tao" and their interactions with the "demi-gods" of politics. It shows the funny side of the state of Philippine affairs while making viewers very aware of what is really happening to the country. It was aired on ABS-CBN from  January 16, 1991, to June 17, 1997, replaced by Oka Tokat. It was re-aired on Jeepney TV. A sequel sitcom called Eto Na Ang Susunod Na Kabanata aired with some of the actors reprising their roles.

Cast and characters

Main cast

Supporting cast
 Ogie Diaz
 Alicia Mayer as Adeline 
 Eagle Riggs
 Jon Santos as Various characters
 Nanette Inventor as Luningning Lagmay-Kataruray
 Ruby Rodriguez as Trisha Llamado
 Nena Perez Rubio as Dino's Grandmother
 Boyong Baytion

Awards
 1991 PMPC Star Awards for Television: Best Comedy Show
 1992 New York Festival: Bronze Medal

References

External links
 
 Abangan Ang Susunod Na Kabanata at Telebisyon.net

ABS-CBN original programming
Philippine television sitcoms
1991 Philippine television series debuts
1997 Philippine television series endings
Filipino-language television shows
Philippine satire